The Chery E5 is a compact car produced by the Chinese manufacturer Chery from 2011 to 2016. It is based on the same platform as the Chery A5.

Features

Riich G3 
The Riich G3 is a rebadged, redesigned and more premium version of the Chery E5 marketed under Riich, the premium brand of Chery at the time.

Gallery

References

External links
Official website

E5
Compact cars
Sedans
Cars introduced in 2012
2010s cars